The superior ganglion of the vagus nerve, (jugular ganglion) is a sensory ganglion of the peripheral nervous system. It is located within the jugular foramen, where the vagus nerve exits the skull. It is smaller than and proximal to the inferior ganglion of the vagus nerve.

Structure 
The neurons in the superior ganglion of the vagus nerve are pseudounipolar and provide sensory innervation (general somatic afferent) through either the auricular or meningeal branch. The axons of these neurons synapse in the spinal trigeminal nucleus of the brainstem. Peripherally, the neurons found in the superior ganglion form two branches, the auricular and meningeal branch.

Function

Auricular branch of the vagus nerve 

The superior ganglion contains neurons which innervate the concha of the auricle, the posteroinferior surface of the external auditory canal and posteroinferior surface of the tympanic membrane all via the auricular branch of the vagus nerve.

Meningeal branch of the vagus nerve 

The superior ganglion contains neurons which innervate some of the dura mater lining the posterior cranial fossa via the meningeal branch of the vagus nerve.

Development 

The neurons in the superior ganglion of the vagus nerve are embryonically derived from the neural crest.

Clinical significance

Vagal neuralgia 
Pain in the external auditory canal (otalgia) can in rare cases be due to vagal neuralgia because of vascular compression of the vagus nerve (often by the posterior inferior cerebellar artery). The affected neurons are found in the superior ganglion and innervate the ear via the auricular branch of the vagus. The condition is treated by microvascular decompression of the vagus nerve where it exits the brainstem.

References 

Vagus nerve
Nervous ganglia of the head and neck